Suleyman Vazirov — Soviet statesman of Azerbaijani origin, organizer of the oil industry in Azerbaijan SSR, first Minister of Oil Industry in the republic from 1954 to 1959.

Biography 
Suleyman Vazirov was born in 1910 in Shusha to Vazirov family. His father, Azad bey Vazirov, received military training in St. Petersburg and was a rittmeister, and her mother, Zahra khanum, was the daughter of the famous doctor of his time, Karim bey Mehmandarov. Suleyman Vazirov studied at the Shusha Real School, then entered the Baku Industrial and Economic College. In addition to studying at the technical school, he was also working as a cinema mechanic's assistant. After graduating from technical school, he began working in Bibi-Heybat oil rig.

In 1928, he entered the mining faculty of Azerbaijan Technical University, which he graduated in 1932. He served as head of the Main Directorate for Oil Production in the Southern and Western Regions of the USSR MNP (1946-1949), Minister of the Oil Industry (1954-1959), Chairman of the National Economy Council (1959-1965), Deputy Chairman of the Council of Ministers (1965-1970), Deputy Chairman of the Presidium of the Supreme Soviet of the Azerbaijan SSR (1970-1973). 

Besides that he was an elected a member of the Central Committee of the Communist Party of Azerbaijan and the Central Committee of the Communist Party of Turkmenistan. He served as deputy of the Supreme Soviet of the USSR of the 3rd, 5th and 6th convocations (in 1950-1954 and 1958-1966), the Azerbaijan SSR of the 4th, 7th and 8th convocations (in 1955-1959 and since 1967) ... 

He died on February 7, 1973, after a long illness. He was buried in Baku on the Alley of Honor.

Family 
He was married to Valida Vazirova (1920-2012), daughter of Rashid bey Akhundzadeh, Governor of Baku in 1919 during Azerbaijan Democratic Republic. Together they had:

 Shamil Vazirov (1942-2001) - Doctor of Chemical Sciences, Professor
 Murad Vazirov (1947-1996)
 Rauf Vazirov - married to Fidan Rzayeva, daughter of Rasul Rza and Nigar Rafibeyli in 1968

Awards 

 Hero of Socialist Labor (24 January 1944)
 Order of Lenin (27.4.1940; 24.1.1944; 8.1.1948; 19.3.1959 - four times)
 Order of the Red Banner of Labor (6/6/1942; 1/28/1950; 5/15/1951; 12/10/1960; 5/23/1966; 8/25/1971 - six times)
 Stalin Prize of the third degree (1951) - for the discovery and development of a new oil field
 Medal "For Valiant Labour in the Great Patriotic War 1941–1945"
 Jubilee Medal "In Commemoration of the 100th Anniversary of the Birth of Vladimir Ilyich Lenin"

References 

1910 births
1973 deaths
Azerbaijan Technical University alumni
Heroes of Socialist Labour
Stalin Prize winners
Recipients of the Order of Lenin
Recipients of the Order of the Red Banner of Labour
Members of the Supreme Soviet of the Azerbaijan Soviet Socialist Republic
Third convocation members of the Supreme Soviet of the Soviet Union
Fifth convocation members of the Supreme Soviet of the Soviet Union
Sixth convocation members of the Supreme Soviet of the Soviet Union
Burials at Alley of Honor
Vazirovs